The 1995 WTA German Open was a women's tennis tournament played on outdoor clay courts at the Rot-Weiss Tennis Club in Berlin in Germany that was part of Tier I of the 1995 WTA Tour. The tournament was held from 15 May through 21 May 1995. Arantxa Sánchez Vicario won the singles.

Finals

Singles

 Arantxa Sánchez Vicario defeated  Magdalena Maleeva 6–4, 6–1
 It was Sánchez Vicario's 5th title of the year and the 62nd of her career.

Doubles

 Amanda Coetzer /  Inés Gorrochategui defeated  Gabriela Sabatini /  Larisa Savchenko 4–6, 7–6, 6–2
 It was Coetzer's 2nd title of the year and the 8th of her career. It was Gorrochategui's 2nd title of the year and the 6th of her career.

Prize money

External links
 ITF tournament edition details
 Tournament draws

WTA German Open
WTA German Open
1995 in German tennis